George Henry Tadman (5 November 1914 – 28 September 1994) was an English professional footballer. His clubs included Bristol Rovers, Charlton Athletic, Gillingham. and Cheltenham Town before in 1948 becoming Street F.C. player manager.

He made over 130 Football League appearances.

Gillingham
Tadman rejoined Gillingham in the summer of 1935. Tadman finished the 1935–36 season as top goalscorer for Gillingham with 18 goals.

Charlton Athletic
Tadman moved on to Charlton Athletic in the summer of 1936, and with it moved up from the Third Division South to the First Division. Tadman finished the 1936–37 season with 11 goals from 29 appearances. In the summer of 1937 Charlton Athletic toured Canada and the United States. Tadman scored 12 goals on the tour, including 7 against Saskatchewan All-Stars on 17 June 1937.
The 1937/38 season ended with Tadman scoring 15 goals in 32 games. The following season Tadman scored 24 goals in 32 games, including 4 in a 7-1 demolition of Manchester United on 13 February 1939. Tadman also missed a penalty in this game. 
Tadman started the 1939–40 season well scoring 2 goals in 3 games, before the league was abandoned due to the start of the Second World War.

War years
Tadman guested during the war years for Aberaman Athletic, where he scored 4 goals in 1944–45, and Bath City, where he scored 6 in the same season, as well as Swansea Town, Bristol City and Ipswich Town, where he made 1 appearance in 1945–46.

References

1914 births
1994 deaths
English footballers
English expatriate footballers
Expatriate footballers in France
Gillingham F.C. players
Bristol Rovers F.C. players
Charlton Athletic F.C. players
Cheltenham Town F.C. players
FC Sète 34 players
Ligue 1 players
Aberaman Athletic F.C. players
Association football wingers